The 1993 Skoda Grand Prix was a professional ranking snooker tournament that took place at The Hexagon in Reading, Berkshire, England. Skoda replaced long-time sponsors Rothmans after 9 years and this year was the last time it was played at the Hexagon. The event started on 18 October 1993 and the televised stages were shown on BBC between 23 and 31 October 1993.

Jimmy White was the defending champion, but he lost his last 16 match against Ken Doherty. Peter Ebdon won in the final 9–6 against Doherty to win his first major title.

Tournament summary 

Defending champion Jimmy White was the number 1 seed with World Champion Stephen Hendry seeded 2. The remaining places were allocated to players based on the world rankings.

Prize fund and ranking points
The breakdown of prize money and ranking points of the event are shown below:

Main draw

Final

References

1993
Grand Prix
Grand Prix (snooker)
Grand Prix